Saigon Football Club was a Vietnamese professional association football club administered by Saigon Football Development Joint Stock Company. Following the relegation from 2022 season and problems related to the club's ownership, the team will be dissolved and give the slot to Lam Dong FC in 2023 season.

The club's name was set as a result of a club known as Hà Nội got renamed and relocated in 2016 to Ho Chi Minh City.

Ho Chi Minh City Football Club was formerly known as Cảng Sài Gòn.

History

FC Tokyo partnership
In February 2020, Saigon announced a cooperation agreement with Japanese club FC Tokyo, which includes plans for a joint football academy being started in Vietnam.

Kit suppliers and shirt sponsors

Affiliated clubs

 FC Ryukyu
 Azul Claro Numazu
 FC Tokyo

Season

Continental record

Stadium
Saigon had played at Thong Nhat Stadium in District 10, Ho Chi Minh City since the club was founded in 2016.

In 2020, the club purchased the Thanh Long Sports Center in District 8, Ho Chi Minh City. The proposed Saigon Football Academy would jointly operate with FC Tokyo and it would be based out of this location.

Home stadium
Thong Nhat Stadium (2016–2023) District 10, Ho Chi Minh City – capacity 16,000

Other stadiums
Thanh Long Sports Center (2020–2023) District 8, Ho Chi Minh City – capacity 5,000

Players

First-team squad
Click here

Management and staff

Current staff

Managerial history

References

External links
Official website
Saigon FC at VPF.vn

Saigon FC
Defunct football clubs in Vietnam
Football clubs in Ho Chi Minh City
2016 establishments in Vietnam
2023 disestablishments in Vietnam
Works association football clubs in Vietnam
Association football clubs established in 2016
Association football clubs disestablished in 2023